Jean-Christophe Yoccoz (29 May 1957 – 3 September 2016) was a French mathematician. He was awarded a Fields Medal in 1994, for his work on dynamical systems.

Biography
Yoccoz attended the Lycée Louis-le-Grand, during which time he was a silver medalist at the 1973 International Mathematical Olympiad and a gold medalist in 1974. He entered the École Normale Supérieure in 1975, and completed an agrégation in mathematics in 1977. After completing military service in Brazil, he completed his PhD under Michael Herman in 1985 at Centre de mathématiques Laurent-Schwartz, which is a research unit jointly operated by the French National Center for Scientific Research (CNRS) and Ecole polytechnique. He took up a position at the University of Paris-Sud in 1987, and became a professor at the Collège de France in 1997, where he remained until his death. He was a member of Bourbaki.

Yoccoz won the Salem Prize in 1988.
He was an invited speaker at the International Congress of Mathematicians in 1990 at Kyoto, 
and was awarded the Fields Medal at the International Congress of Mathematicians in 1994 in Zürich. He joined the French Academy of Sciences and Brazilian Academy of Sciences in 1994, became a chevalier in the French Legion of Honor in 1995, and was awarded the Grand Cross of the Brazilian National Order of Scientific Merit in 1998.

Mathematical work
Yoccoz's worked on the theory of dynamical systems, his contributions include advances to KAM theory, and the introduction of the method of Yoccoz puzzles, a combinatorial technique which proved useful to the study of Julia sets.

Notable publications
 Yoccoz, J.-C. Conjugaison différentiable des difféomorphismes du cercle dont le nombre de rotation vérifie une condition diophantienne. Ann. Sci. École Norm. Sup. (4) 17 (1984), no. 3, 333–359. doi:10.24033/asens.1475
 Yoccoz, Jean-Christophe. Théorème de Siegel, nombres de Bruno et polynômes quadratiques. Petits diviseurs en dimension 1. Astérisque No. 231 (1995), 3–88.

References

1957 births
2016 deaths
20th-century French mathematicians
21st-century French mathematicians
Fields Medalists
Academic staff of Paris-Sud University
École Normale Supérieure alumni
Members of the Brazilian Academy of Sciences
Recipients of the Great Cross of the National Order of Scientific Merit (Brazil)
Lycée Louis-le-Grand alumni
Members of the French Academy of Sciences
International Mathematical Olympiad participants
Dynamical systems theorists
Nicolas Bourbaki
Academic staff of the Collège de France